Albany busway station is a bus station on Auckland's Northern Busway in New Zealand. It is located near Oteha Valley Road in the suburb of Albany. It has shelters, electronic real-time information on each platform, and park and ride parking. The busway lanes have extended to this station from the south since May 2022.

The next station southbound is Constellation busway station. The next station northbound is Hibiscus Coast busway station, to which the busway lanes do not yet extend.

Buses travelling via Albany Station include double-decker buses serving the Northern Express NX1 and NX2 routes.

History 
The station, as well as the neighbouring Constellation Station, were the first stations to open as part of the Northern Busway project in November 2005. While the dedicated busway lanes of the Northern Busway themselves did not open until 2008, Albany was originally designed as an 'Offline' station that was not located directly on the busway as the other stations were.

Park and ride 
The usage of the park and ride facility and the number of carparks has long been a contentious issue. At opening, the station had 350 car parks with another 1,000 planned to be added to meet demand as needed. However, by 2016, the capacity of the park and ride was insufficient to meet demand. The 1100 parking spaces were regularly filled up by 7:30 AM everyday and, as a consequence, commuters who wanted to use the facility would try to find alternative locations to park - often places where it was illegal to park such as grass berms, walkways, and the middle of the road.

Services
As of 20 February 2020, the following bus routes serve Albany station: NX1, NX2, 866, 83, 861, 890, 917, 986, 856, 865, 889.

References

Northern Busway, Auckland
Buildings and structures in Auckland
Bus stations in New Zealand
Transport buildings and structures in the Auckland Region